David Gómez Martínez (born February 13, 1981 in O Rosal, Pontevedra) is a Spanish decathlete. He is a two-time national junior champion, an eleven-time national senior champion, and a two-time Olympian. He also won two silver medals for the decathlon at the 2000 IAAF World Junior Championships in Santiago, Chile, and at the 2006 Ibero-American Championships in Ponce, Puerto Rico.

In 2004, Gomez set both his personal best and a championship record of 7,904 points, by winning the gold medal at the Ibero-American Championships in Huelva. Shortly after his first international success, Gomez was eventually selected to compete for Spain at the 2004 Summer Olympics in Athens, where he placed twenty-fifth in the men's decathlon event, with a solid score of 7,865 points.

At the 2008 Summer Olympics in Beijing, Gomez competed for the second time in men's decathlon, despite having a serious physical injury. During the competition, he set seasonal bests in the 100 metres (11.12 seconds), discus throw (40.17 m), and javelin throw (62.22 m), as well as his personal best in the 1500 metres (4:30.74). Gomez, however, failed to clear a height in the pole vault, which cost him a chance for a medal. In the end, he finished abruptly in twenty-fifth place, with a total score of 6,876 points.

Gomez is a full-time member of Club Atletico Celta de Vigo in Vigo, Spain, being currently coached and trained by Jesus Lence.

Personal bests

References

External links
 
  
 
 
 
 Profile – Celta de Vigo 
 
 

Living people
1981 births
Sportspeople from Pontevedra
Spanish decathletes
Spanish male athletes
Olympic athletes of Spain
Athletes (track and field) at the 2004 Summer Olympics
Athletes (track and field) at the 2008 Summer Olympics